Mardkanlu (also Romanized as Mardkānlū and Mardakānlū; also known as Mehdī Kānlū) is a village in Faruj Rural District, in the Central District of Faruj County, North Khorasan Province, Iran. At the 2006 census, its population was 110, in 32 families.

References 

Populated places in Faruj County